F. Gilbert Hills State Forest (previously known as Foxboro State Forest) is a , pine and oak Massachusetts state forest located in the towns of Foxborough and Wrentham. The forest, which is managed by the Massachusetts Department of Conservation and Recreation (DCR), was named for a former State Forester and employee.

F. Gilbert Hills State Forest is adjacent to the Harold B. Clark Town Forest to its north, and is connected to Wrentham State Forest to its west. The "minimally developed" Franklin and Wrentham state forests are managed in conjunction with the Gilbert Hills property.

Contained on state forest land are some unique stone structures that some believe were made and used by the native Algonquin tribes prior to the town's founding.

Activities and amenities
Trails: The forest has  trails, including a section of the  Warner Trail, for walking, hiking, mountain biking, horseback riding, cross-country skiing, and off-road vehicle use. 
The forest also offers accessible restrooms, picnicking, and restricted hunting.

References

External links

F. Gilbert Hills S.F. Map Department of Conservation and Recreation
Franklin State Forest Department of Conservation and Recreation
Wrentham State Forest Department of Conservation and Recreation

State parks of Massachusetts
Massachusetts state forests
Massachusetts natural resources
Parks in Norfolk County, Massachusetts
Year of establishment missing